Hypostomus ancistroides is a species of catfish in the family Loricariidae. It is native to South America, where it occurs in the Tietê River basin. The species reaches 21 cm (8.3 inches) in total length and is believed to be a facultative air-breather.

References 

ancistroides
Catfish of South America
Fish described in 1911